Kim Chong-hoh (November 30, 1935 – March 3, 2018) was a South Korean parliamentarian and Home Affairs Committee chairman.

Kim served as the founding President of the World Scout Parliamentary Union, and as a parliamentarian, he was instrumental in the creation of a group of former Scouts elected to representative positions in Korea, in 1983.

In 1998, Kim was awarded the 265th Bronze Wolf, the only distinction of the World Organization of the Scout Movement, awarded by the World Scout Committee for exceptional services to world Scouting, at the 1999 World Scout Conference.

References

External links

1935 births
2018 deaths
Recipients of the Bronze Wolf Award
Scouting in South Korea
Members of the National Assembly (South Korea)
Interior ministers of South Korea
Governors of North Chungcheong Province
Seoul National University School of Law alumni
People from Goesan County
Gim clan of Gyeongju
Deputy Speakers of the National Assembly (South Korea)